Nona Faustine is an American photographer and visual artist who was born and raised in Brooklyn, New York.

She is a graduate of the School of Visual Arts in New York, NY and The International Center of Photography at Bard College MFA program. Her work focuses on history, identity, representation, and what it means to be a woman in the 21st century. Her work is in the collection of the Brooklyn Museum, and the Carnegie Museum.

Early life and education 
Faustine was introduced to photography as a child. Her father and uncle were amateur photographers, and Faustine's first camera was a gift from her uncle.

Faustine was initially inspired to become a photographer by a series of Time Life books. She was influenced by Diane Arbus, Richard Avedon, and photojournalist Ernst Haas. However, at a young age Faustine struggled to find herself in the histories of photography she encountered, which focused on photographers who were disproportionately male and white.

Faustine received a BFA at the School of Visual Arts in New York. She earned an MFA at the International Center for Photography-Bard College program in 2013. As an MFA student, Faustine began to move away from the traditional documentary model. "It just didn't work for me anymore. I wanted more room to play with communication. Conceptual works appealed to me."

Faustine began to work on "White Shoes" as a graduate student. Influenced by Lorna Simpson and Carrie Mae Weems, Faustine began the series as her thesis project in 2012 and continued to add to it over the subsequent three years.

Mitochondria (2008–)
In the ongoing series "Mitochondria", Faustine photographs herself, her mother, her sister, and her daughter in their shared home in Brooklyn, NY. The work illuminates both the strength of their familial bond and their interdependent destinies. The New York Times observed that the series is "a celebration of the power of African American women to nurture family, even in the direst circumstances. The series’ title refers to the mitochondrial DNA encoded in human genes, which is inherited solely from the mother. Through this scientific metaphor, the series commemorates the continuity of African American womanhood from one generation to another . . . .The series also underscores the role played by women of color in the struggle for equality and justice. Historically, African American women were marginalized within mainstream feminism. Nevertheless, they were able to turn to and embolden each other in the face of prejudice, even before the advent of the modern feminist movement."

"White Shoes" (2015) 

The White Shoes series portrays the history of slavery in New York through a series of nude self-portraits taken in former locations significant to the slave trade. The series also engages with representation of the black female body.

This work is based on Faustine's research on the history of slavery in the five boroughs of New York City, including slave burial grounds, slave markets, slave owning farms, and the landing spots of slave ships. Standing in white shoes, she reminds viewers how often African-Americans must adopt white culture. Posing on a wooden box at locations around New York where slaves were once sold, "baring her flesh to history, she conveys the most fundamental horror of the slave trade, the way it reduced people to mere bodies, machines of muscle." Her 2016 exhibition at Smack Mellon was reviewed extensively. The New Yorkers Alexandra Schwartz wrote, "Faustine's photos serve to mark the places that belong to a history too often hidden from view, whether by design, or neglect, or the ever-frenetic pace of change inherent to life in New York."

"My Country" (2016) 
"My Country", Faustine's solo exhibition at Baxter St. Camera Club of New York, presented works from the "White Shoes" series, as well as a series of photographs of monuments. The monuments, including the Statue of Liberty and The Lincoln Memorial, are pictured with a black line slicing through the image. The Village Voice wrote that her work was "a frank rendering of America's disgraceful and all-too-buried legacy of marginalization" and explained the impact of the monument photographs: "the graphic interruption stands for the scores of mistreated Americans for whom such structures and their supposed representation of the common good have remained inaccessible"

Publications 
White Shoes, Nona Faustine et al., Mack - 2021

Performances and exhibitions 
"The Outwin American Portraiture Today," 2019, National Portrait Gallery, Washington, DC
"Perilous Bodies," Ford Foundation, NY, 2019 Group Exhibition.
"Slavery In The Hands Of Harvard," Harvard University, 2019 Group Exhibition.
"Refraction: New Photography of Africa and its Diaspora", Steven Kasher Gallery, 2018, Group exhibition
"Making Them Known: Nona Faustine", Artspace, New Haven, CT, 2017, solo exhibition 
 "My Country", Baxter Street Camera Club, New York, NY, December 8, 2016 – January 14, 2017, Solo Show
 "MAMI", Knockdown Center, Maspeth, NY 2016 Group Exhibition
 "Race&Revolution", Governors Island, NY 2016 Group Exhibition
 "The Future Is Forever", International Center of Photography, Mana Contemporary Art Center Jersey City, NJ 2015 Group Exhibition

Awards 

 2019  Anonymous Was A Woman
 2019  Colene Brown Art Prize
 2019  Finalist in the Smithsonian National Portrait Gallery Outwin Boochever Competition

Collections

References

External links 
 http://nonafaustine.virb.com/home

Living people
American photographers
School of Visual Arts alumni
1977 births